The Dorobanțul is a right tributary of the river Țibrin in Romania. It flows into the Țibrin in Tortoman.

References

Rivers of Romania
Rivers of Constanța County